Pragya TV is a Hindi-language 24/7 television channel, owned by Hindu Group Limited. The channel is a free-to-air and launched on 3 November 2007. It relaunched 14 May 2015. The channel is available across all major cable and DTH platforms as well as online.

References

Hindi-language television channels in India
Television channels and stations established in 2015
Hindi-language television stations
Television channels based in Noida
2015 establishments in Uttar Pradesh